Arrius may refer to:

Personal name
 the nomen or "gentile name" of the Arria gens, which identified a man as being a member of the gens - see the article for a list of those with the nomen
 Arrius Varus, Roman soldier who supported Vespasian during the turbulent Year of Four Emperors
 Lucius Flavius Aper (died 284 AD), also known as Arrius Aper, a professional soldier who rose to become the Praetorian prefect
 Quintus Arrius, a fictional character in the novel Ben-Hur: A Tale of the Christ and various adaptations

Other uses
 5263 Arrius, an asteroid
 Turbomeca Arrius, a turboshaft helicopter engine